

List of tools internally available from the Eclipse platform
 Connected Data Objects (CDO): A free implementation of a Distributed Shared Model on top of EMF
 ATL: A QVT-like language functioning with Eclipse/EMF, together with a library of model transformations. ATL is the current Eclipse M2M solution.
 Bonita Open Solution: A Business Process Management solution which contains a studio based on EMF and GMF to edit BPMN diagrams.
 Borland Together: A Java and UML modeling IDE with QVT integration.
 KM3: A metamodeling language; Metamodels written in KM3 may be automatically converted in a number of other metameta models.
 Acceleo: A code generator implementing the OMG MOFM2T specification.
 VIATRA2: A graph-based transformation language.
 GEMS: A bridge between Generic Modeling Environment (GME) and the Eclipse Modeling Project (EMP).
 Xtext: A framework for the development of domain-specific languages and other textual programming languages.
  Sirius: Technology for creating custom graphical modeling workbenches by leveraging the Eclipse Modeling technologies, including EMF and GMF.

List of tools that may use Eclipse EMF but are available on private source-forges or others development repositories 
 SmartQVT: An open source implementation of the QVT-Operational language. This tool compiles QVT transformations into EMF-based Java programs.
 Kermeta: A multi-purpose tool made by IRISA and based on EMF for model development, model constraint checking, model exploration, model transformation and much more.
 Papyrus: A MDE UML modeler based on EMF.
 Rational Software Modeler: A UML modeler that uses the EMF-based UML2 model.

Modeling Framework based software